Texas is a state located in the Southern United States. At the 2020 United States Census, 21,096,153 (72.38%) of the 29,145,505 residents of Texas lived in a municipality.

Municipalities

As of May 2022, the 1,221 active Texas municipalities include 970 cities, 228 towns, and 23 villages. These designations are determined by Census Bureau requirements based on state statutes and may not match a municipality's self-reported designation. The types of municipalities in Texas are defined in the Local Government Code, which was codified in 1987. The designations of city, town and village were superseded by Type A, B, and C general-law cities in the code.

In Texas, there are two forms of municipal government: general-law and home-rule. A general-law municipality has no charter and is limited to the specific powers granted by the general laws of the state. Home-rule municipalities have a charter and derive the "full power of local self-government" from the Constitution of Texas. A general-law municipality containing more than 5,000 inhabitants may order an election on adopting a home-rule charter. If the population of the municipality later falls below 5,000, it may maintain its home-rule charter.

Three pairs of municipalities share the same name: Lakeside, Oak Ridge, and Reno.

See also

 Texas
 List of census-designated places in Texas
 List of unincorporated communities in Texas

Notes

References

Further reading

External links
 Texas Municipal League (TML) – A lobbying association for Texas municipalities.

 
Texas, List of cities in
Texas
Texas geography-related lists